George H. Miller (May 7, 1856 – March 6, 1927) was an American architect who practiced in Bloomington, Illinois. Miller spent almost his entire life in Bloomington, learning the architecture trade through local firm Richter & Bunting. Miller established his own practice in 1875 and designed many of Bloomington's prominent buildings. He was also involved in civic affairs, serving as alderman and treasurer. Miller designed two of Altgeld's castles.

Biography
George H. Miller was born on May 7, 1856. His parents, born in Germany, settled in Bloomington, Illinois a year before his birth. He attended public schools as a child and helped on the family farm. When he was fifteen years old, Miller started to work for Richter & Bunting, one of the few architectural firms in Bloomington at the time. In 1874, Miller studied with John T. Harris in Columbus, Ohio, then went to Chicago to work as a draftsman for Fredrick & Edward Bauman.

He returned to Bloomington in 1875 to work for businessman Henry A. Miner; Miller designed buildings in his free time. Miller's first major commission was the McLean County Jail, completed in 1880. He opened his first practice in 1885. Miller was in high demand after the Great Fire of 1900, which destroyed most of the Central Business District.

Aside from his role as an architect, Miller was active in civil affairs. He served terms as city treasurer, alderman, and chancellor of the local Knights of Pythias chapter. Miller married Rose Stautz, the daughter of a fellow alderman, in 1887. They had three children: Kenneth, Raymond, and Sallie. He received an appointment as Superintendent of U.S. Government Buildings in 1894, though the scope of the position is uncertain. Miller ran for mayor in 1895 but was defeated. Miller fell ill in 1923 and retired; he died on March 6, 1927.

Notable works

All buildings are in Bloomington unless noted otherwise
McLean County Jail, 1880
Elder Building, 1884
George H. Cox House, 1886
Jung and Kleinau Buildings, 1886
St. Mary's Catholic Church, Bloomington, IL, 1886
Edward B. Gridley House, 1887
George H. Miller House, 1890
Louis Jehle House, Pana, IL 1895
John W. Cook Hall, Normal, IL, 1896
Holy Trinity Church Rectory, 1896
Old Main, Charleston, IL, 1899
George Brand Building, 1900
The Castle, 1898
Corn Belt Bank Building, 1901
Central Fire Station, 1902
Livingston Building, 1902
McLean County Courthouse and Square, 1903 (with Paul O. Moratz and Arthur L. Pillsbury)
Alfred Phillips House, Gibson City, IL, 1903
Chatterton Opera House, 1910

References

1856 births
1927 deaths
Architects from Illinois
People from Bloomington, Illinois
American people of German descent